Laryngotracheitis may refer to:

 the combination of the following two medical conditions: laryngitis and tracheitis
 a disease of poultry caused by Gallid alphaherpesvirus 1